Rufus Edward Ries Black (born 20 May 1969) is the vice-chancellor of the University of Tasmania.

Early life and education
Black was educated at Wesley College and the University of Melbourne, where he resided at Ormond College and graduated with a Bachelor of Arts in politics and economics and a Bachelor of Laws with honours in 1994. He won a Rhodes Scholarship in 1992, and obtained a Diploma of Theology and Master of Philosophy in Ethics and Theology in 1994 from Keble College, Oxford. He was awarded a Doctor of Philosophy in Ethics and Theology from Magdalen College, Oxford in 1996. His DPhil thesis was entitled "Towards an Ecumenical Ethic: Reconciling the Work of Stanley Hauerwas, Germain Grisez and Oliver O'Donovan".

Career
Black has been vice-chancellor and president of the University of Tasmania since March 2018.

Black began his academic career at Oxford University as a tutor from 1994 to 1996. From 1997 to 1999, he served as chaplain of Ormond College and the Sanderson Fellow at the United Faculty of Theology, where he lectured in ethics. He has combined an academic career with experience in public policy and consulting at McKinsey & Company, where he worked for nine years as a consultant from 2000 to 2006 and later as a partner from 2007 to 2008.

Black was involved across the education sector as master of Ormond from 2009 to 2017, deputy chancellor of Victoria University from 2013 to 2017 and the founding chair of the board for Teach for Australia from 2009 to 2017. He was a director of the New York-based Teach for All from 2010 to 2015. He was a director of the law firm Corrs Chambers Westgarth, the Walter and Eliza Hall Institute, Museums Victoria and Innovation Science Australia. Black co-founded the Wade Institute of Entrepreneurship. Before joining the University of Tasmania he was the Professor of Enterprise in the Department of Management and Marketing, principal fellow in the Department of Philosophy and a member of the programs team at the Centre for Ethical Leadership at the University of Melbourne.

Public policy work
Black's public policy work has included leading the budget audit of the Department of Defence in 2009, the accountability and governance review of the Department of Defence ("The Black Review") in 2010 and the prime minister's independent review of the Australian Intelligence Community in 2011. He was the strategic advisor to the secretary for education in Victoria from 2012 to 2014.

References 

University of Melbourne alumni
Alumni of Keble College, Oxford
Alumni of Magdalen College, Oxford
Living people
Academic staff of the University of Melbourne
Australian Rhodes Scholars
WEHI staff
McKinsey & Company people
Academic staff of the Victoria University, Melbourne
1969 births